Kębłowice may refer to the following places in Poland:
Kębłowice, Lower Silesian Voivodeship (south-west Poland)
Kębłowice, Masovian Voivodeship (east-central Poland)